A total lunar eclipse took place on Friday, September 27, 1996, the second of two lunar eclipses in 1996, the first being on Thursday, April 4. This is the 41st member of Lunar Saros 127. The previous event is the September 1978 lunar eclipse. The next event is the October 2014 lunar eclipse.

This eclipse was the second of an almost tetrad (that occurred when there were 4 consecutive lunar eclipses that had an umbral eclipse magnitude of 0.9 or greater). The others were 04 Apr 1996 (T), 24 Mar 1997 (P) and 16 Sep 1997 (T).

Visibility
It was visible from all of North and South America, Europe and Africa.

Mid-infrared image of the Moon

During its totality, the Midcourse Space Experiment (MSX) satellite's SPIRIT-III instrument took the image of the Moon in mid-infrared. At these wavelengths, MSX was able to characterize the thermal (heat) distribution of the lunar surface during the eclipse. The brightest regions are the warmest, and the darkest areas are the coolest. The well-known crater Tycho is the bright object to the south of center. Numerous other craters are also seen as bright spots, indicating that their temperature is higher than in the surrounding dark mare.

Related eclipses

Eclipses of 1996
 A total lunar eclipse on April 4.
 A partial solar eclipse on April 17.
 A total lunar eclipse on September 27.
 A partial solar eclipse on October 12.

Lunar year series
This is the second of four lunar year eclipses at the descending node of the moon's orbit.

Saros series
Lunar saros series 127, repeating every 18 years and 11 days, has a total of 72 lunar eclipse events including 54 umbral lunar eclipses (38 partial lunar eclipses and 16 total lunar eclipses). Solar Saros 134 interleaves with this lunar saros with an event occurring every 9 years 5 days alternating between each saros series.

Half-Saros cycle
A lunar eclipse will be preceded and followed by solar eclipses by 9 years and 5.5 days (a half saros). This lunar eclipse is related to two annular solar eclipses of Solar Saros 134.

See also
 List of lunar eclipses
 List of 20th-century lunar eclipses

References

External links
 Saros cycle 127
 
 September 1996 lunar eclipse

1996-09
1996 in science
September 1996 events